{{Speciesbox
| image = Noctuidae - Apamea rubrirena.JPG
| image_caption = 
| taxon = Apamea rubrirena
| authority = (Treitschke, 1825)
| synonyms_ref = 
| synonyms = {{collapsible list|bullets = true
|Apamea rubrirena marginipicta Varga, 1973
|Apamea rubrirena pacifica Sugi, 1982
|Crymodes rubrirena asciburgensis Koch, 1965
|Crymodes rubrirena miriquidoiKoch, 1963
Crymodes rubrirena rhaetonorica Koch, 1965
|Crymodes shibuyae Matsumura, 1925
|Hadena feisthamelii Boisduval, 1833
|Hadena rubrirena abnoba Guth, 1932
|'Hadena rubrirena fennica Guth, 1932
|Hadena rubrirena var. hercyniae Staudinger, 1871
|Mamestra rubrirena Treitschke, 1825
|Mamestra sylvicola Eversmann, 1843
}}
}}Apamea rubrirena is a moth of the family Noctuidae.

Distribution
This species is present from northern and western Europe, east through Russia and Asia to Japan and Korea. It is also present on the Kuril Islands, the Aleutian Islands and has been reported from Alaska for the first time in 1989.

Habitat
In Europe they especially occur in the Alps and in lower mountains, while in Russia they can be found in the taiga.

DescriptionApamea rubrirena has a wingspan of 40–51 mm. These moths are extraordinarily variable in terms of color, wing shape and size. They usually have head and thorax black-brown, with some white hairs and a meta-thopracic rufous crest. The basic color of the forewings vary from pale orange to reddish brown or blackish brown, with reniform rufous patches and transversal indistinct or whitish wavy lines. The hind wings are monochrome, light gray-brown, with the veins clearly protruding. Tarsi are black with whitish rings.

Biology
The caterpillars overwinter and pupate in May or June of the following year. Adults are on wing from fly from mid or late June to August and sometimes September in favourable conditions. There is one generation per year univoltine species.

The larvae feed on a various grasses, including Festuca altissima and Calamagrostis arundinacea. Adults are nocturnal and have been found taking nectar from Rubus, Cirsium oleraceum, Silene vulgaris and Phyteuma''.

Bibliography
Boisduval (1833): Description de quatre nouvelles espèces de Noctuélides. — Annales de la Société entomologique de France 2: 373-378, pl. XIV. Paris (Méquignon-Marvis). 
Treitschke, F. (1825): Die Schmetterlinge von Europa 5 (2): 1-448. Leipzig (Gerhard Fleischer). 
Zille, A., Ronkay, L. & M. Fibiger (2005): Noctuidae europaeae. Volume 8. Apamaeini. — 323 S., Farbtafeln; Sorø (Entomological Press).

References

External links

 Paolo Mazzei, Daniel Morel, Raniero Panfili Moths and Butterflies of Europe and North Africa
 Naturhistoriska Risksmureet

Apamea (moth)
Moths of Asia
Moths of Europe
Moths of North America
Taxa named by Georg Friedrich Treitschke
Moths described in 1825